Breedon Cloud Wood and Quarry is a  biological and geological Site of Special Scientific Interest north-east of Worthington in Leicestershire. It is a Geological Conservation Review site.

Cloud Wood is an ancient semi-natural wood on clay. It has a very diverse ground flora, including pendulous sedge, yellow archangel and giant bellflower. The quarry is a nationally important geological locality, exposing a Lower Carboniferous succession deposited in shallow seas.

There is public access to most of the nature reserve, but not to the quarry.

References

Sites of Special Scientific Interest in Leicestershire
Leicestershire and Rutland Wildlife Trust
Geological Conservation Review sites